An annular solar eclipse will occur on Saturday, February 6, 2027. A solar eclipse occurs when the Moon passes between Earth and the Sun, thereby totally or partly obscuring the image of the Sun for a viewer on Earth. An annular solar eclipse occurs when the Moon's apparent diameter is smaller than the Sun's, blocking most of the Sun's light and causing the Sun to look like an annulus (ring). An annular eclipse appears as a partial eclipse over a region of the Earth thousands of kilometres wide.

Images 
Animated path

Related eclipses

Eclipses in 2027
 An annular solar eclipse on February 6.
 A penumbral lunar eclipse on February 20.
 A penumbral lunar eclipse on July 18.
 A total solar eclipse on August 2.
 A penumbral lunar eclipse on August 17.

Solar eclipses 2026–2029

Saros 131

Metonic series

References

External links 
 http://eclipse.gsfc.nasa.gov/SEplot/SEplot2001/SE2027Feb06A.GIF

2027 2 6
2027 in science
2027 2 6
2027 2 6